The 1998–99 AFC Bournemouth season saw the club participate in Second Division, the Auto Windscreens Shield, the FA Cup, and the Football League Cup. Bournemouth finished 7th in Division Two. They reached the Fourth Round of the FA Cup, the Third Round of the League Cup and reached the Quarter Finals of the Auto Windscreens Shield.

Season squad

Final league table

Competitions

Legend

Second Division

Results

League Cup

FA Cup

Football League Trophy

References 

A.F.C. Bournemouth
AFC Bournemouth seasons
English football clubs 1998–99 season